This is an incomplete list of notable persons of Kashmiri origin.

Activists 

 Ataullah Shah Bukhari, Indian freedom struggle activist.
 Amanullah Khan (JKLF) co- founder of JKLF and an activist.
 Parveena Ahanger, co-founder and chairman of the Association of Parents of Disappeared Persons (APDP), nominated for a Nobel Peace Prize in 2005.
 Parvez Imroz, Kashmiri human rights lawyer and a civil rights activist.
 Mushtaq Pahalgami, Social Activist, Environmentalist, President Himalayan Welfare Organization, Pahalgam
 Khurram Parvez, Kashmiri human rights activist.
 Sanaullah Amritsari, Indian freedom struggle activist and co-founder of Jamia Millia Islamia
 Shehla Rashid, Political and civil rights activist. 
 Ayub Thakur, (1948 – 2004) Kashmiri political activist and founder of London-based World Kashmir Freedom Movement (WKFM),

Administrators, diplomats, bankers and jurists 

 Amitabh Mattoo (1962– ), Vice Chancellor, Jammu University, thinker & writer, Padma Shri awardee
 Bakshi Ghulam Mohammad, Prime Minister Jammu and Kashmir 1953 to 1964.
 Birbal Dhar (early 19th century), invited Maharaja Ranjit Singh to Kashmir
 Braj Kumar Nehru (1909–2001), ambassador of India to the United States (1961–1968) and Governor of Assam (1968–1973)
 Durga Prasad Dhar (1918–1975), ambassador of India to the Soviet Union, and politician
 Farah Pandith (1969– ), U.S. State Department Special Representative
 Farooq Abdullah, former Cabinet Minister and Former Chief Minister of Jammu and Kashmir
 Farooq Khan, ex IPS, credited with creating JKP SOG.
 Ghulam Nabi Azad (1949 born), politician and former CM of Jammu and Kashmir.
 Haji Gokool Meah, industrialist and businessman in Trinidad and Tobago
 M. L. Madan, Veterinarian, Scientist, Administrator.
 Masood Khan, Career Diplomat and President of Azad Jammu & Kashmir[
 Markandey Katju, (1946-), Former Judge at the Supreme Court of India
 Masud Choudhary (b.1944)Prominent educator, social reformer and former administrator vice-chancellor. 
 Mehraj Mattoo (1961– ), British Investment Banker, Economist, Harvard Fellow
 Mirza Pandit Dhar, Kashmiri during the rule of Azim Khan
 Mohan Lal (1812–1877), diplomat in the First Anglo-Afghan War, and writer
 Neel Kashkari (1973– ), Interim Assistant Secretary of the Treasury for Financial Stability in the US Treasury
 P. K. Kaul (1929-2007), ambassador of India to the United States (1986–1989)
 Purushottam Narayan Haksar (1913–1998), political strategist
 Rafiq Ahmad Pampori (born 1956), Islamic scholar, author and the former Principal of the Government Medical College, Srinagar.
 Rameshwar Nath Kao (1918–2002), first chief of the Research and Analysis Wing, India's intelligence agency (from 1969 to 1977)
 Sameera Fazili, Kashmiri American attorney and community development finance expert who is a deputy director of the National Economic Council in the Biden Administration.
 Shah Faesal IAS topper (2009), youth icon, politician
 Sheikh Abdullah (5 December 1905 – 8 September 1982), Leader of the National Conference, Prime Minister of the state of Jammu and Kashmir after its accession to India in 1947.
 T.N. Kaul (1913–2000), ambassador of India to USA (1973–1976), Soviet Union & Iran. Foreign Secretary, Indian Ministry of External Affairs.
 V. N. Kaul Comptroller and Auditor General of India (2002-2008).
 Tej Bahadur Sapru (1875–1949), lawyer, political and social leader during the British Raj
 Triloki Nath Khoshoo (1927–2002), secretary of the Department of Environment in the Indira Gandhi Government, and environmentalist
 Vijaya Lakshmi Pandit (1900–1990), ambassador of India to the United States (1949–1952), President of the United Nations General Assembly (1953), politician, sister of Jawaharlal Nehru
 Zafar Choudhary Journalist, author, policy analyst, and practitioner of peace-building.
 Zaffar Iqbal Manhas writer, poet, social activist and Pahari politician hailing from Jammu and Kashmir.

Armed forces

 Brij Mohan Kaul, commanded the Indian forces in the Sino-Indian War
 Asghar Khan, Pakistan First Air Force Chief Air Marshal
 General Aziz Khan, Chairman Joint Chiefs of Staff Committee in the Pakistan Army
 Colonel Anil Kaul, VrC, Indian Army
 Mahendra Nath Mulla
 Mohammed Amin Naik, Major General Indian Army
 Mushaf Ali Mir, Air Chief Marshal (1947–2003) Chief of the Air Staff of the Pakistan Air Force (2000–2003)
 S. K. Kaul (1934– ), Air Chief Marshal of the Indian Air Force, former Chief of Air Staff (1993–1995)
 Tahir Rafique Butt, Air Chief Marshal is the current Chief of the Air Staff of Pakistan Air Force (2012 -)
 Tapishwar Narain Raina (1921–1980), [Chief of Army Staff of the Indian Army (1975–1978)

Authors and poets 

Abdul Ahad Azad, Kashmiri poet
Agha Shahid Ali, (1949-2001) Poet
Amin Kamil (1924-2014), Kashmiri poet & short story writer
Ata ul Haq Qasmi, Urdu-language Poet, playwright and columnist.
Basharat Peer (1977– ), author
Baabarr Mudacer, singer
Bhamaha Poet of kavyalankara
Bilhana, 11th century poet
Chandrakanta (1938– ), novelist and short story writer
Dina Nath Walli alias Al-mast Kashmiri (1908–2006), poet as well as renowned water color artist
Fahad Shah, journalist
Ghulam Ahmad (1885–1952), poet, better known by the pen name Mahjoor
Ghulam Nabi Firaq (1922-), poet, writer and educationist
Habba Khatun 16th century poet, known as Zoon (the Moon) because of her immense beauty
Hakeem Manzoor (1937–2006) an Urdu writer, poet & administrator. He has written more than 15 books including Na Tamaam, Barf Ruton Ki Aag and Lahu Lamas Chinar.
 Hanifa Deen, Australian writer winner of New South Wales Premier's Literary Awards — Ethnic Affairs Commission Award of 1996.
Hari Kunzru (1969– ), British novelist of Kashmiri descent
Javaid Rahi (1970) Tribal researcher of national repute working on tribal Gujjar culture. 
Khalid Hasan (1935–2009) writer, senior Pakistani journalist and diplomat.
Krishna Hutheesing (1907–1967), author, and sister of Jawaharlal Nehru
Madhosh Balhami, (1966-), poet known for his elegies for dead militants
Mahmud Gami (1765–1855), composed a version of the story of Yusuf and Zulaikha
Manju Kak, short story writer
Maqbool Shah Kralawari (1820–1876), lyricist
Marghoob Banihali, Kashmiri poet from Banihal, Kashmir.
Meeraji (1912–1949) Urdu poet, lived the life of a bohemian and worked only intermittently
Mirza Waheed British Novelist born and raised in Kashmir. 
Momin Khan Momin (1800–1851) poet known for his Urdu ghazals
Moti Lal Kemmu (1933– ), playwright
Muhammad Din Fauq (1877-1945) writer and first journalist of Kashmir.
Muhammad Iqbal (1877–1938) Muslim poet and philosopher. Commonly referred to as Allama Iqbal
Nayantara Sahgal (1927– ), Indo-Anglian writer, novelist
Nyla Ali Khan, Professor, writer, granddaughter of Sheikh Abdullah.
Pamposh Bhat, (1958– ), author and environmentalist.
Rasul Mir, also known as the John Keats of Kashmir.
Rehman Rahi, Kashmiri poet
Rahul Pandita, Kashmiri author and journalist.
Rudrata poet
S.L. Sadhu (1917–), Scholar, Professor, poet, writer, folklorist and Historian
Saadat Hasan Manto (1912–1955), short story writer, member Progressive Writers' Movement
Salman Rushdie (1947– ), British-Indian novelist and essayist
Santha Rama Rau (1923– 2009), travel writer
Sheikh Showkat Hussain (1954– ), author and political analyst
Tanha Ansari (1914 – 1969), poet
Vishnu Sharma author of panchtantra
Zinda Kaul (1884–1965), poet, also known as Masterji
Zulfiqar Naqvi Urdu poet and English lecturer, from Mendhar Tehsil, Jammu and Kashmir

Businesspeople and industrialists

 Farooq Kathwari (born 1944), American businessman, CEO of Ethan Allen
Haji Gokool Meah, Trinidadian and Tobagonian industrialist, philanthropist, and cinema magnate 
 Jamim Shah, Nepali businessman, known as Cable King of Nepal

Philosophers and historians 

 Abhinavagupta, (ca. 950–1020), one of India's greatest philosophers, mystics and aestheticians
 Ahmad Hasan Dani (1920–2009), intellectual, archaeologist, historian, linguist
 Anandavardhana (820–890), philosopher and author of the Dhvanyaloka
 Bhaskara, writer on the Kashmir Shaivism
 Bhatta Kallata, a Shaivite thinker
 Gopi Krishna (1903–1980), writer and mystic
 Prem Nath Bazaz Kashmiri politician, scholar and author
 Jonaraja (15th century), historian and poet
 Kalhana (12th century), historian and author of Rajatarangini
 Kalidasa (most likely 5CE) classic Sanskrit author
 Kshemaraja (10th century), philosopher and a disciple of Abhinavagupta
 Kumarajiva (4th n 5 century CE), Buddhist scholar in China
 Lalleshwari (1320–1392), saint-poet
 Prajna Bhatta (16th century), historian
 Shrivara (15th century), historian
 Somananda (875–925) a teacher of Kashmir Shaivism
 Subhash Kak (1947– ), writer, philosopher, and computer scientist
 Utpaladeva, a teacher of Kashmir Shaivism
 Vasugupta (860–925), author of the Shiva Sutras of Vasugupta

Politicians 

 Abdul Ghani Lone (1932–2002), lawyer, politician and founder of the People's Conference
 Abid Hassan Minto Pakistani lawyer and politician
 Agha Shorish Kashmiri scholar, writer, debater, and leader of the Majlis-e-Ahrar-ul-Islam, figure of the freedom movement of undivided India
 Asiya Andrabi (1963), Chief Of Dukhtaran-e-Millat, Kashmiri separatist leader
 Baba-e-Poonch Khansahb Col. Khan Muhammad Khan, member of the Jammu & Kashmir Assembly from 1934 to 1946. Chairman War Council of Azad Jammu & Kashmir in 1947 and then member Defence Council. Founder of Sudhan Educational Conference.
 Bakshi Ghulam Mohammad (1907–1972), Prime Minister of Jammu and Kashmir (1953–1963)
 Begum Akbar Jahan Abdullah, Politician, wife of Sheikh Abdullah
 Birbal also Maheshdas Bhat (1528–1586), the Grand Vizier (Wazīr-e Azam) of the Mughal court in the administration of Emperor Akbar
 Birbal Dhar leader in the Kashmiri resistance to Afghan rule in the early 19th century
 Deepa Kaul (1944– ), former minister, social worker and human rights defender
 G. M. Saroori former minister of Jammu and Kashmir for mechanical engineering and Road and building (R&B)
 G. N. Ratanpuri (1954–), Member of Parliament (Rajya Sabha) from J&K National Conference
 Ghulam Ahmad Ashai, educator, reformer, a founder of the University of Kashmir
 Ghulam Mohammad Shah (1920–2009)), Chief Minister of Jammu and Kashmir (1984–1986)
 Ghulam Muhammad Sadiq, Prime Minister of Jammu and Kashmir (1964–1965), Chief Minister of Jammu and Kashmir (1965–1971)
 Ghulam Nabi Azad (1949– ), former Chief Minister of Jammu and Kashmir
 Hashim Qureshi, (1953–), Chairman Jammu & Kashmir Democratic Liberation Party
 Hina Pervaiz Butt, Pakistani politician and MLA.
 Indira Gandhi (1917–1984), Prime Minister of India, daughter of Jawaharlal Nehru
 Ishaq Dar, Federal Minister of Pakistan
 Jawaharlal Nehru (1889–1964), first Prime Minister of independent India
 Kailash Nath Katju (1887–1968), freedom fighter, lawyer, participated in INA trials, former governor, chief minister of several Indian states, cabinet minister under Jawaharlal Nehru
 Khan of Mong
 Khawaja Muhammad Asif MNA Sailkot PML-N
 Khawaja Saad Rafique Pakistani Minister of Railways
 Khwaja Shams-ud-Din (1922–1999), Prime Minister of Jammu and Kashmir (1963–1964)
 Khurshid Hasan Khurshid, First elected President of Azad Kashmir (1924-1988)
 Kiran Imran Dar, MNA of National Assembly of Pakistan 
 Mirza Afzal Beg (d.1982) was the first Deputy Chief Minister of Jammu and Kashmir and was the Founder of All Jammu and Kashmir Plebiscite Front.
 Maqbool Butt (1938–1984), co-founder of the JKLF Party
 Masarat Alam, Separatist leader
 Maulana Mazhar Ali Azhar (1895–1974) one of founders, leader of Majlis-e-Ahrar-ul-Islam, political figure in the history of Sub-Continent
 Mehbooba Mufti (1959– ), female politician, member of the 14th Lok Sabha. Mirza Mehboob Beg succeeded her and got elected to the 15th Lok Sabha.
 Mirwaiz Maulvi Farooq (d. 1990), chairman of the Aawami Action Committee
 Mirza Mehboob Beg (1949-), is a former Member of Parliament, Lok Sabha from Anantnag and has also been a Cabinet Minister, elected to the Jammu and Kashmir Legislative Assembly twice and Jammu and Kashmir Legislative Council once.
 Mohammad Abdul Qayyum Khan President and Prime minister of Azad Jammu & Kashmir
 Muhammad Ibrahim Khan (1915 – 2003), founder and first President of Azad Kashmir.
 Mohammad Shafi Qureshi, (1929– ), former governor of Bihar and of Madhya Pradesh, State Railway Minister
 Motilal Nehru (1861–1931), Indian independence activist, president of the Indian National Congress
 Mufti Muhammad Sayeed (1936– 2016), Chief Minister of Jammu and Kashmir (2002–2005)
 Mohammad Yasin, British Labour Party politician serving as the Member of Parliament
 Muzaffar Baig (1946– ), Deputy Chief Minister, Finance Minister, Law Minister, Tourism Minister of Jammu & Kashmir (2002–2008)
 Nasir Aslam Wani, Provincial President JKNC and former Home Minister of Jammu & Kashmir
 Nawaz Sharif (1949– ), former Prime Minister of Pakistan
 Nazir Ahmed, Baron Ahmed Baron Ahmed (born 24 April 1957) is a member of the House of Lords of the United Kingdom. He was created a life peer on the recommendation of Prime Minister Tony Blair in 1998. Neel Kashkari (1973- ), American banker and politician
 Omar Abdullah (1970– ), former Chief Minister Jammu And Kashmir, member of the 14th Lok Sabha, son of Farooq Abdullah
 Peer Mohammed Hussain (1941- ), former Minister of State Jammu and Kashmir and founding member of Jammu and Kashmir People's Democratic Party.
 Qurban Hussain (born 27 March 1956 in Kotli, Azad Kashmir) is a British–Pakistani Liberal Democrat politician and life peer.
 Rajiv Gandhi (1944–1991), Prime Minister of India, son of Indira Gandhi, grandson of Jawaharlal Nehru
 Ram Chandra Kak (1893–1983), Prime Minister of Jammu and Kashmir during 1945–47 and an archaeologist
 Sadiq Ali (1952– ), politician, poet, writer, and environmentalist
 Saif-ud-din Soz (1937– ), long-time member of the Parliament of India, former Union Minister of Environment & Forests, former Minister of Water Resources, President JKPCC
 Saifuddin Kitchlew (1888–1963), freedom fighter and politician
 Sardar Attique Ahmed Khan President and Prime Minister of Azad Jammu & Kashmir
 Sardar Khalid Ibrahim Khan, Politician
 Sardar Muhammad Ibrahim Khan, Politician, Freedom Fighter and Former President of Azad Jammu & Kashmir
 Shabana Mahmood, British Labour Party politician and barrister. Member of Parliament (MP) for Birmingham.
 Shabir Shah (1953– ), Founder of the Jammu & Kashmir Democratic Freedom Party. Known as Nelson Mandela of Indian Administered Kashmir
 Shaikh Rasheed Ahmad Ex Federal Information Minister Pakistan
 Shehbaz Sharif, Prime Minister of Pakistan.
 Sheikh Abdullah (1905–1982), Prime Minister of Jammu and Kashmir (1948–1953), Chief Minister of Jammu and Kashmir (1975–1977, 1977–1982)
 Sheila Kaul (1915– ), former Indian governor and cabinet minister, social reformer, and educationist
Sher Ahmed Khan, Guerrilla fighter and also served as the President of Azad Kashmir
 Syed Ali Shah Geelani (1929– ) Member Jamait-e-Islami, Founder and Chairman of Tehreek-e-Hurriyat J&K, Chairman All Parties Hurriyat Conference
 Syed Mir Qasim, Chief Minister of Jammu and Kashmir (1971–1975)
 Usman Dar, politician of PTI from Sialkote
 Vijaya Lakshmi Pandit (1900–1990) Indian diplomat and politician. Sister of Jawaharlal Nehru
 Zarah Sultana British Labour Party politician who and the Member of Parliament

Royalty 

 Avantivarman, King of Kashmir
 Didda, Ruler of Kashmir
 Durlabhaka-Pratapaditya II
 Durlabhavardhana, founder of Karkota dynasty
 Lalitaditya Muktapida, emperor of Kashmir (724–760)
 Sankaravarman, King of Kashmir

Saints, mystics and philosophers 

 Kashyapa 
 Baba Shadi Shaheed, a Sufi Saint and first Chib Rajput convert to Islam 
 Bhagwan Gopinath (1898–1968), a mystic and saint
 Bhatta Kallata Shaivite scholar
 Hamza Makhdoom (c. 1494 – c. 1576), popularly known as Makhdoom Sahib, a Kashmiri Sufi mystic, scholar and spiritual teacher
 Lal Ded (1320–1392), a Shaivite saint
 Mian Muhammad Bakhsh (1830–1907), kashmiri Gujjar a Sufi saint and poet
 Rupa Bhawani (ca. 1620 – ca. 1720), a mystic from the Saahib clan of Kashmiri Pandits
 Somananda Shaivite non dualism mystic
 Sheikh Noor-ud-din Wali (1377–1440), a saint who belonged to the Rishi order
 Swami Lakshman Joo (1907–1991), a scholar of Kashmir Shaivism

Scholars and educationists 

 Ahmad Hasan Dani (1920–2009), Pakistani intellectual, archaeologist, historian, and prolific linguist
 Aga Syed Yousuf, (1904-1982) was a Kashmiri religious scholar and leader of Shia Muslims. He founded the influential Anjuman-e-Sharie organization.
 Balajinnatha Pandita (1916–2007), Sanskrit scholar, expert on Kashmir Shaivism
 Braj Kachru (1932– ), researcher in English linguistics
 Charaka medicinal science scholar
 Hakeem Ali Mohammad (1906–1987), Unani Medicine scholar, physician expert on Unani Medicine
 Ismat Beg mathematician, known for his work on Multiple-criteria decision analysis, and fixed point (mathematics).
 Jaishree Odin, post-modern literary theorist, professor of Interdisciplinary Studies at the University of Hawaii
 Kailas Nath Kaul (1905–1983), botanist, agricultural scientist, agronomist, and educationist
 Nyla Ali Khan, Professor, writer, granddaughter of Sheikh Abdullah.
 Nazir Ahmad Qasmi (1 June 1965 ), Grand Mufti of the Darul Uloom Raheemiyyah in Kashmir.
 Omkar N. Koul (1941– ), researcher in linguistics, language education, communication, and comparative literature
 Patañjali, compiler of the Yoga Sūtras, a collection of aphorisms on Yoga practice
 Rahmatullah Mir Qasmi, Islamic scholar and founder of Darul Uloom Raheemiyyah
 Ravinder Kumar (1933–2001), historian
 Salman Rushdie - Fiction writer and academic
 Samsar Chand Kaul (1883-1977), teacher, author and ornithologist of Kashmir
 Sushruta medical science 
 Vatesvara scholar of trigonometry 
 Vijay Vaishnavi - Researcher and scholar in the computer information systems field

Separatist leaders and militants

 Afzal Guru, convict in 2001 Delhi parliament attack
 Ashfaq Majeed Wani
 Ashiq Hussain Faktoo, Pro-Pakistan militant leader
 Ashraf Sehrai Former Chairman of Hurrirat Conference
 Asiya Andrabi
 Burhan Wani, former commander and militant of Hizbul Mujahideen
 Farooq Ahmed Dar, former militant and current chairman of Jammu Kashmir Liberation Front
 Masarat Alam
 Mirwaiz Umar Farooq
 Mohammad Abbas Ansari, a Kashmiri separatist, ex-chairman of the All Parties Hurriyat Conference
 Muhammad Ahsan Dar, founder and ex Commander of Hizbul Mujahideen
 Syed Ali Shah Geelani
 Sayeed Salahudeen, the head of Hizb-ul-Mujahideen, pro-Pakistan Kashmiri separatist militant organisation operating in Kashmir.
 Yasin Malik, president of the Jammu Kashmir Liberation Front
 Zakir Rashid Bhat, commander of Ansar Ghazwat-ul-Hind

Sportspeople 

 Abid Nabi, (1985- ), once regarded as fastest bowler in India
 Amjad Khan, (21 August 1966) Kashmiri-born-American former cricketer.
 Aadil Manzoor Peer, International ice stock sport Athlete.
 Adil Rashid, English Cricketer
 Adil Nabi, Footballer 
 Afaq Raheem, a first-class cricketer 
 Aleem Dar, International cricket Umpire
 Amad Butt, Pakistani Cricketer
 Asif Dar, boxer
 Awais Zia, Pakistani Cricketer.
 Haroon Rasheed Dar (1953– ), former Pakistani cricketer.
 Imran Arif Pakistani-born English first-class cricketer
 Imtiaz Abbasi Pakistani born Emirati international cricketer 
 Iqra Rasool (2000-), cricketer
 Mehrajuddin Wadoo (1984– ), member of the India national football team and East Bengal FC 
 Moeen Ali English Cricketer 
 Munir Dar, Member of Pakistan National hockey Team
 Nauman Anwar Pakistani Cricketer
 Nida Dar, Pakistani cricketer
 Parvez Rasool (1989 -) first Kashmiri cricketer to play for India National Cricket team 
 Salman Butt former Pakistan test captain
 Sana Mir (1986– ), female Pakistani cricketer and captain of the Pakistan women's team
 Sikandar Raza Pakistani-Zimbabwean Cricketer
 Suresh Raina, cricketer
 Tabarak Dar Pakistani-born cricketer who played for Hong Kong
 The Great Gama, wrestler
 Umran Malik Indian cricketer
 Usman Khawaja, Pakistani-Australian cricketer
 Usama Mir Pakistani cricketer
 Vivek Razdan (1967– ), member of the Indian Cricket Team

Visual and performing artists 

 Aamir Bashir, actor
 Abhay Sopori, Santoor player, composer & musician
 Abid Kashmiri, actor
 Aditya Dhar, director
 Ahad Raza Mir, Pakistani actor
 Ali Azmat, Musician
 Alia Bhatt, actress, singer, producer & entrepreneur
 Alla Rakha, actor
 Angira Dhar, actress 
 Anupam Kher, actor
 Anwar Shemza (1928–1985) artist and writer in Pakistan, later in UK. Published Urdu novels, poetry and plays
 Asrar (musician), singer-songwriter
 Asif Raza Mir, Pakistani actor
 Bansi Kaul, theater director
 Bhajan Sopori, Santoor player
 D.K. Sapru (1916–1979), actor
 Emmad Irfani, model/actor
 Farhan Saeed, actor
 Ghulam Hassan Sofi (1932–2009) singer and harmonium player
 Ghulam Mohammad Saznawaz, proponent of Kashmiri SufiMusic
 Ghulam Nabi Sheikh, singer and composer
 Ghulam Rasool Santosh (1929–1997), painter
 Hina Khan, television & film actress 
 Ilyas Kashmiri, actor
 Iqbal Kashmiri, film director
 Katrina Kaif actress 
 Kshmr Indian American DJ with Kashmiri ethnicity
 Khalid Abbas Dar, artist
 Khawaja Khurshid Anwar (1912–1984) filmmaker, writer, director and composer
 Kiran Kumar, actor
 Kunal Khemu, actor
 Leenesh Mattoo, actor 
 Malika Pukhraj (1912–2004), highly popular Ghazal and folk singer in Pakistan
 Mani Kaul (1950–2011), Film Maker
 Manohar Kaul, painter
 MC Kash Kashmiri hip hop artist
 Mekaal Hasan, Pakistani musician and record producer, leader and composer for Mekaal Hasan Band
 Mir Sarwar, Bollywood actor
 Mohit Raina, actor
 Mohit Suri, film director
 Mudasir Rehman Dar, sketch artist 
 Muhammad Younis Butt Pakistani screenwriter 
 Muneeb Butt, Pakistani actor
 Mushtaq Kak (1961– ), theatre director
 Neerja Pandit, singer, Kashmiri Folk Music, Hindi Film & Television Music
 Omkar Nath Dhar (Jeevan), actor
 Osman Khalid Butt, actor
 Pran Kishore, Kashmiri drama writer
 Priya Raina, actor, singer, voice artist 
 Priti Sapru, actor
 Pushkar Bhan, Padamashree, a radio actor & drama writer
 Qazi Touqeer (1985– ), singer in Kashmiri and Hindi languages
 Raj Begum, singer
 Raj Zutshi, Bollywood & TV Actor
 Ratan Parimoo (1936– ), art historian and painter
 Reyhna Malhotra, actress 
 Samina Peerzada, Pakistani television and film actress, director
 Sandeepa Dhar, actor
 Sanjay Suri, actor
 Śārṅgadeva 13th century, Musicologist, also known as Father of Indian Music 
 Shaheer Sheikh, actor from Bhaderwah, Doda District of J&K
 Soni Razdan TV actor and director
 Shadi Lal Koul (1954–2020), Kashmiri actor
 Zayn Malik British musician.

Journalists 
 Aamir Peerzada, award-winning journalist and documentary filmmaker.
 Aarti Tikoo Singh, assistant editor in The Times of India, conflict and international affairs writer and former reporter
 Altaf Qadri, Photojournalist working with the Associated Press
 Gharida Farooqi, television host and anchorperson. 
 Hamid Mir, award-winning journalist, columnist and an author. 
 Kamran Yousuf, Freelance Kashmiri photojournalist
 Moeed Pirzada, Kashmiri-British political commentator, geostrategic analyst and television news journalist.
 Nidhi Razdan, award-winning television journalist.
 Qazi Shibli, journalist and editor of The Kashmiryat.
 Masrat Zahra, freelance Kashmiri photojournalist.
 Rahul Pandita, Kashmiri author and journalist.
 Sajjad Haider, journalist and editor of Kashmir Observer.
 Shujaat Bukhari (25 February 1968 – 14 June 2018),veteran Kashmiri journalist and the founding editor of Rising Kashmir
 Yusuf Jameel Veteran Kashmiri journalist known for his coverage of Kashmir conflict.

See also
List of people from Jammu and Kashmir

References

 Kashmir
People Kashmir
Kashmiri